Mount Kerinci (also spelled Kerintji, among several other ways, and referred to as Gunung Kerinci, Gadang, Berapi Kurinci, Kerinchi, Korinci/Korintji, or Peak of Indrapura/Indrapoera) is an active stratovolcano and the highest mountain in Sumatra, Indonesia. It is surrounded by the lush forest of Kerinci Seblat National Park, home to several endangered species including the Sumatran tiger.

Geography
 
It is part of the Barisan Mountains, a chain of volcanoes that span from the extreme northwest of the island (in Aceh province) all the way to the extreme southeast (in Lampung province).

Volcanic activity
Kerinci is more active than most Indonesian volcanoes, with nearly annual phreatic eruptions. In 2009, Kerinci erupted again and followed by June 2, 2013 eruption with  spewed black smoke.

Climbing
Kerinci was first climbed in December 1877 by Dutch mountaineers Arend Ludolf van Hasselt and Daniël David Veth. It can be climbed from the village of Kersik Tuo, 6 or 7 hours away from Padang by car or bus. The climb and descent normally takes 2 days and 1 night, when choosing to go all the way to the summit. Climbers may also choose to go up only as far as Camp 2 or 3, skipping the summit attempt, which requires a pre-dawn climb.  
Kerinci's terrain consists of thick jungle, and can get muddy and slippery even if there are only mild drizzles, which may occur occasionally even during the dry season. To climb the volcano a guide is needed, as there have been rare cases of people disappearing after attempting to trek alone.

Lakes
The Kerinci Seblat National Park has at least fifteen lakes of note, with the biggest being Kerinci Lake, followed by Gunung Tujuh Lake. Gunung Tujuh Lake (literally, Seven Mountains Lake) is a caldera lake formed in an extinct volcano, and is surrounded by seven peaks.

Kecik Wok Gedang Wok
Based on research in 1973, the 'Kecik Wok Gedang Wok' people are recognized as the first tribe to settle at a plateau around Mount Kerinci 10,000 years ago. Today, the Kecik Wong Gedang Wok people are limited due to assimilation with the Proto-Malay tribes which came later. Around 135 dialects are used only along the valley. This makes ethnographic analysis difficult to conduct.

See also

 List of volcanoes in Indonesia
 Kerinci Seblat National Park

References

External links
 
 Satellite picture by Google Maps

Stratovolcanoes of Indonesia
Subduction volcanoes
Volcanoes of Sumatra
Volcanic crater lakes
Active volcanoes of Indonesia
Mountains of Sumatra
Landforms of Jambi
Holocene stratovolcanoes